The association football (soccer) tournament at the 1984 Summer Olympics started on July 29 and ended on August 11, taking place throughout the United States. It was the first Olympic soccer competition in which officially professional players were allowed. Until then, the amateur-only rule had heavily favored socialist countries from the Eastern Bloc whose players were professionals in all but name. However, as agreed with FIFA to preserve the primacy of the World Cup, the Olympic competition was restricted to players with no more than five "A" caps at tournament start, regardless of age.

The soccer tournament was held in four venues:
 Harvard Stadium (Boston)
 Navy–Marine Corps Memorial Stadium (Annapolis, Maryland)
 Stanford Stadium (Stanford, California)
 Rose Bowl (Pasadena, California)

The Gold medal game between France and Brazil at the Rose Bowl attracted an Olympic Games soccer attendance record of 101,799. Until 2014 this remained the record attendance for a soccer game in the United States. This broke the previous Olympics record attendance of 100,000 set at the Melbourne Cricket Ground in Australia for the game of the 1956 Olympic Games played between the Soviet Union and Yugoslavia. The Rose Bowl attendance would remain the Olympic record until 104,098 attended the game of the 2000 Summer Olympics between Cameroon and Spain at the Stadium Australia in Sydney.

The attendance also stood as the highest for a soccer game in the United States until 109,318 saw Manchester United defeat Real Madrid during the 2014 International Champions Cup at the Michigan Stadium in Ann Arbor.

Schedule

Qualifying

Sixteen teams qualified for the Olympic tournament after continental qualifying rounds. Three Warsaw Pact countries had qualified but withdrew as part of the Soviet-led boycott. They were replaced as follows:
 East Germany were replaced by Norway.
 USSR were replaced by West Germany.
 Czechoslovakia were replaced by Italy.

Africa (CAF)

Asia (AFC)

North and Central America (CONCACAF)

South America (CONMEBOL)

Europe (UEFA)

 (replaces )
 (replaces )
 (replaces )

Hosting nation

Venues

Medalists

 Gold Medal – 
William AyacheMichel Bensoussan Michel BibardDominique Bijotat François BrissonPatrick Cubaynes Patrice GarandePhilippe Jeannol Guy Lacombe Jean-Claude Lemoult Jean-Philippe Rohr
Albert Rust Didier Sénac Jean-Christophe Thouvenel José Touré Daniel Xuereb Jean-Louis Zanon
Coach: Henri Michel

 Silver Medal – 
Pinga Davi Milton Cruz Luís Henrique Dias André Luís Mauro Galvão Tonho KitaGilmar Popoca Silvinho Gilmar Ademir Paulo Santos Ronaldo Silva DungaChicão Luiz Carlos Winck
Coach: Jair Picerni

 Bronze Medal – 
Mirsad Baljić Mehmed Baždarević Vlado Čapljić Borislav Cvetković Stjepan Deverić Milko Đurovski Marko Elsner Nenad Gračan Tomislav Ivković Srečko Katanec Branko Miljuš Mitar Mrkela Jovica Nikolić Ivan PudarLjubomir Radanović Admir Smajić
Dragan Stojković
Coach: Ivan Toplak

Match officials

Africa
  Mohamed Hossameldin
  Gebreyesus Tesfaye
  Bester Kalombo

Asia
  Abdul Aziz Al-Salmi
  Kyung-Bok Cha
  Toshikazu Sano

North and Central America
  Tony Evangelista
  Antonio Márquez Ramírez
  Luis Paulino Siles
  David Socha
  Edward Bellion

South America
  Romualdo Arppi Filho
  Gastón Castro
  Jesús Díaz
  Jorge Eduardo Romero

Europe
  Enzo Barbaresco
  Ioan Igna
  Jan Keizer
  Brian McGinlay
  Joël Quiniou
  Volker Roth
  Victoriano Sánchez Arminio
  Edvard Šoštarič

Squads

Final tournament

Group stage

Group A

Group B

Group C

Group D

Knockout stage

Quarter-finals

Semi-finals

Bronze Medal match

Gold Medal match

Final team rankings

Statistics

Goalscorers
With five goals, Daniel Xuereb of France, Borislav Cvetković and Stjepan Deverić of Yugoslavia are the top scorers in the tournament. In total, 84 goals were scored by 52 different players, with none of them credited as own goal.

5 goals
 Daniel Xuereb
 Borislav Cvetković
 Stjepan Deverić

4 goals
 Gilmar Popoca

3 goals

 Dale Mitchell
 François Brisson
 Rudolf Bommer
 Uwe Rahn
 Jovica Nikolić

2 goals

 Dunga
 Emad Soliman
 Beniamo Vignola
 Hussein Saeed
 Joar Vaadal
 Khalid Al-Muhannadi
 Rick Davis
 Christian Schreier

1 goal

 Kita
 Ronaldo Silva
 Silvio Paiva
 Paul Bahoken
 Louis-Paul Mfédé
 Roger Milla
 Gerry Gray
 Igor Vrablic
 Jaime Baeza
 Fernando Santis
 Evaristo Coronado
 Enrique Rivers
 Magdi Abdelghani
 Mahmoud El Khatib
 Khaled Gadallah
 Dominique Bijotat
 Patrice Garande
 Philippe Jeannol
 Guy Lacombe
 Jean-Claude Lemoult
 Ali Hussein Shihab
 Franco Baresi
 Pietro Fanna
 Aldo Serena
 Mustapha Merry
 Per Egil Ahlsen
 Majed Abdullah
 Gregg Thompson
 Jean Willrich
 Manfred Bockenfeld
 Andreas Brehme
 Frank Mill
 Mirsad Baljić
 Nenad Gračan
 Ljubomir Radanović

Discipline
In the final tournament, a player was suspended for the subsequent match in the competition for getting a red card. The following twelve players were sent off and suspended during the final tournament:

Trivia 
The wave was first broadcast internationally during the 1984 Olympic football final, when it was done among the 100,000 in attendance at the Rose Bowl, Pasadena.

References

External links

Olympic Football Tournament Los Angeles 1984, FIFA.com
RSSSF Summary
FIFA Technical Report

 
1984 Summer Olympics events
1984
1984 in association football
Summer Olympics 1984
Soccer in California
Oly
1984 in sports in California
1984 in sports in Massachusetts
1984 in sports in Maryland
Sports in Stanford, California